Arrowhead Towne Center, often referred to by locals as Arrowhead Mall, is a super-regional shopping mall located in Glendale, Arizona (west suburban Phoenix). The mall is owned by Macerich & GIC Private Limited. It is anchored by Macy's, Dillard's, JCPenney, and Dick's Sporting Goods. The mall includes an AMC Theatres and is home to 180 tenants. Arrowhead also serves as a transit center for Valley Metro Bus.

History 
The mall opened in October 1993 on land formerly occupied by an orange grove, located at Bell Road and 75th Avenue, and was jointly developed and owned by Westcor and General Growth Properties (the former which owned a two-thirds share and managed the mall, and the latter which owned a one-third share). The Weitz Company, Inc. was general contractor who built the mall. When opened the mall was anchored by Robinsons-May, Montgomery Ward, Mervyn's, J. C. Penney, Dillard's, and an empty anchor pad that was not yet leased.

When Montgomery Ward declared bankruptcy in December 2000, they shut down all of their remaining locations, including Arrowhead. Shortly after, Sears and Roebuck announced they will be acquiring 18 of the former Wards space, including the location at Arrowhead. Sears opened in spring of 2002, a year after Wards closed.

In 2002, Westcor was acquired by Macerich, who continues to manage the mall today. In 2011, GGP sold its 1/3 ownership in the mall (along with its 1/3 ownership of Superstition Springs Center in Mesa), with Macerich assuming full ownership.

In 2006, Macy's acquired Robinsons-May and converted the Arrowhead store into a Macy's store.

Since about 2007, Arrowhead Towne Center has been undergoing a transition to serve a more affluent and upscale shopper, in relation to its traditional middle-income customer base. The mall is already home to the West Valley's first Sephora location (opened in 2007), as well as Swarovski, Coach, and the West Valley's first Apple Store (which opened in the summer of 2008). In the past, West Valley shoppers have had to travel to Biltmore Fashion Park and Scottsdale Fashion Square, on the east side of the metropolitan area, to patronize retailers of this caliber. All of these tenants are new to Glendale.

In 2008, Mervyn's went out of business and shuttered, and Forever 21 reopened in the former Mervyn's space on March 27, 2009.

Also in 2008, sporting goods retailer, Dick's Sporting Goods held their grand opening.

In 2016, Macerich sold 40% of the mall to GIC Private Limited.

In April 2019, It was announced Sears would shutter as part of an ongoing plan to phase out of brick-and-mortar. Several prospective tenants have been in discussion.

On January 2, 2022, there were multiple 911 calls because there was an active shooter. When the police came, however, they found a man carrying a gun inside the mall, and was taken into custody.  

In July 2022, it was announced that the Japanese family entertainment center chain Round 1 would be joining the center in 2024.

Anchors 
 AMC Theatres 14 Plex - Opened 1996
 Dick's Sporting Goods - Opened 2008
 Dillard's - Opened 1993, Original Anchor
 JCPenney - Opened 1993, Original Anchor
 Macy's - Opened 2006
 Round 1 - Opening Spring 2024

Former Anchors 
 Forever 21- Opened 2009, Replaced with Round 1 Opening Spring 2024
 Mervyn's - Opened 1993, Replaced with Forever 21 in 2009
 Montgomery Ward - Opened 1993, Replaced with Sears in 2002
 Robinsons-May - Opened 1993, Replaced with Macy's in 2006
 Sears - Opened 2002, Closed in 2019

References

External links
Official site

Macerich
Buildings and structures in Glendale, Arizona
Shopping malls in Maricopa County, Arizona
Shopping malls established in 1993
1993 establishments in Arizona